White Rock Battery was an artillery battery in the British Overseas Territory of Gibraltar. It was located at the northern end of Catalan Bay at the point where the road down to the village meets the main road.

An anti-aircraft gun position was established here during World War II from 1941 to 1944. Two 3.7-inch Mk. II mobile anti-aircraft guns mounted on Mk. III platforms were installed on the battery in April 1941. They were removed on 21 July 1944.

References

Batteries in Gibraltar